The headstand, or sometimes head stand, is a pose that is an inversion posture of standing head down. The technique is used in different settings such as yoga, breakdancing, acrobatics and beginner gymnastics.

Health risks
If the headstand is not done perfectly, the performer is likely to suffer head injury from standing on the head.

In yoga

The yoga headstand, Shirshasana, may be balanced and symmetrical from all perspectives, even though not always in a legs-vertical position. The asana has many variations, several of them asymmetrical.

See also

 handstand

External links

 A video of a head stand
 Freeze and Headstand Tutorial 

Static elements (gymnastics)

ru:Перевёрнутые асаны#Ширшасана